Frank Wels (21 February 1909 – 16 February 1982) was a Dutch football forward who played for Netherlands in the 1934 and 1938 FIFA World Cups. He also played for the amateur team of GVV Unitas in Gorinchem.

References

External links
 FIFA profile

1909 births
1982 deaths
Dutch footballers
Netherlands international footballers
Association football forwards
Feyenoord players
1934 FIFA World Cup players
1938 FIFA World Cup players
People from Ede, Netherlands
Footballers from Gelderland